These are the full results of the 2005 European Cup Super League which was held on 17, 18, and 19 June 2005 at the Stadio Luigi Ridolfi in Florence, Italy.

Final standings

Men's results

100 metres
18 JuneWind: +2.1 m/s

200 metres
19 JuneWind: -0.6 m/s

400 metres
18 June

800 metres
19 June

1500 metres
18 June

3000 metres
19 June

5000 metres
17 June

110 metres hurdles
19 JuneWind: +2.0 m/s

400 metres hurdles
18 June

3000 metres steeplechase
17 June

4 × 100 metres relay 
18 June

4 × 400 metres relay 
19 June

High jump
17 June

Pole vault
19 June

Long jump
18 June

Triple jump
19 June

Shot put
18 June

Discus throw
18 June

Hammer throw
17 June

Javelin throw
19 June

Women's results

100 metres
18 JuneWind: +1.3 m/s

200 metres
19 JuneWind: -0.6 m/s

400 metres
18 June

800 metres
18 June

1500 metres
19 June

3000 metres
18 June

5000 metres
17 June

100 metres hurdles
19 JuneWind: -1.3 m/s

400 metres hurdles
18 June

3000 metres steeplechase
17 June

4 × 100 metres relay 
18 June

4 × 400 metres relay 
19 June

High jump
19 June

Pole vault
18 June

Long jump
17 June

Triple jump
18 June

Shot put
19 June

Discus throw
17 June

Hammer throw
19 June

Javelin throw
18 June

References

European Cup Super League
European
2005 in Italian sport
International athletics competitions hosted by Italy
Sport in Florence